Miracle on 34th Street (initially released as The Big Heart in the United Kingdom) is a 1947 American Christmas comedy-drama film released by 20th Century Fox, written and directed by George Seaton and based on a story by Valentine Davies. It stars Maureen O'Hara, John Payne, Natalie Wood, and Edmund Gwenn. The story takes place between Thanksgiving Day and Christmas Day in New York City, and focuses on the effect of a department store Santa Claus who claims to be the real Santa. The film has become a perennial Christmas favorite.

Miracle on 34th Street won three Academy Awards: Gwenn for Best Actor in a Supporting Role, Valentine Davies for Best Writing, Original Story, and George Seaton for Best Writing, Screenplay. The film was nominated for Best Picture, losing to Gentleman's Agreement. In 2005, the film was selected for preservation in the United States National Film Registry by the Library of Congress as being "culturally, historically or aesthetically significant". The Academy Film Archive preserved Miracle on 34th Street in 2009.

Davies also wrote a short novelization of the tale, which was published by Harcourt Brace simultaneously with the film's release.

Plot
Kris Kringle is indignant to find that the man assigned to play Santa in the annual Macy's Thanksgiving Day Parade is intoxicated. When he complains to event director Doris Walker, she persuades Kris to take his place. He does so well that he is hired to play Santa at Macy's New York City store on 34th Street.

Ignoring instructions from the toy department head, Mr. Shellhammer, to recommend overstocked items to undecided shoppers, Kris directs one woman to another store to fulfill her son's Christmas request. Impressed by Kris's honesty and helpfulness, she informs Shellhammer that she will now become a loyal Macy's customer.

Attorney Fred Gailey, Doris's neighbor, takes the young divorcée's daughter Susan to see Santa. Doris has raised her to not believe in fairy tales, but Susan is shaken after seeing Kris speak Dutch with a girl who does not know English. Doris asks Kringle to tell Susan that he is not Santa, but he insists that he is.

Worried, Doris decides to fire him, but Kris has generated so much positive publicity and goodwill that the store's owner promises bonuses. To alleviate Doris's misgivings, Shellhammer suggests Granville Sawyer administer a "psychological evaluation", but Sawyer recommends Kris's dismissal. Meanwhile, Susan shows Kris a magazine photo of her dream house and tells him she wants it for Christmas; reluctantly he promises to do his best.

In the company cafeteria, young, somewhat chubby employee Alfred tells Kris that Sawyer convinced him that he is unstable simply because he enjoys dressing as Santa Claus. Kris immediately confronts Sawyer, eventually striking him on the head with an umbrella. Sawyer exaggerates his pain to have Kris confined to Bellevue Hospital. Tricked into cooperating and believing Doris to be in on the deception, Kris deliberately fails his examination and is recommended for permanent commitment. However, Fred persuades Kris not to give up.

At a hearing before Judge Henry X. Harper, District Attorney Thomas Mara gets Kris to assert that he is Santa Claus and rests his case, asking Harper to rule that Santa does not exist. In private, Harper's political adviser, Charlie Halloran, warns him that doing so would be disastrous for his upcoming reelection bid. Harper buys time by hearing further evidence.

Fred calls Macy as a witness and gets him to admit that he believes in Santa. On leaving the stand, Macy fires Sawyer. Next, Fred calls Mara's own young son, who testifies that his father told him that Santa is real. Mara has to concede the point, but goes on to demand that Fred prove that Kris is "the one and only" Santa Claus on the basis of some competent authority by the following day.

Meanwhile, Susan writes Kris a letter to cheer him up, which Doris also signs. When a New York Post Office mail sorter sees Susan's letter, addressed to Kris at the New York courthouse, he suggests delivering all of the dead letters addressed to Santa Claus to Kris. As court resumes, Fred is told of the delivery of mailbags to the courthouse; he argues that the Post Office—a branch of the U.S. federal government—has acknowledged that Kris is the one and only Santa Claus by delivering the letters. When the judge insists on seeing them, Fred has them dump bag after bag on Harper's desk. Harper dismisses the case.

On Christmas morning at a party for Macy's employees, Susan loses faith in Kris when he admits he was not able to get her the house she wanted. However, after Kris offers Fred and Doris a route home that avoids traffic, Susan sees her dream house with a "For Sale" sign in front. Demanding that Fred stop the car, she runs into the house, exclaiming, "Mr. Kringle is Santa Claus!" Fred learns that Doris had encouraged Susan to have faith and suggests they get married and purchase the house. He then boasts that he must be a great lawyer since he proved an eccentric old man was Santa. However, when he and Doris spot a cane in the house that looks just like Kris's, he is not so sure.

Cast

Production

Miracle on 34th Street was shot on location in New York City, with the Macy's Thanksgiving Day Parade sequences filmed live while the 1946 parade was happening. "It was a mad scramble to get all the shots we needed, and we got to do each scene only once," Maureen O'Hara recalled in her memoir. "It was bitterly cold that day, and Edmund and I envied Natalie (Wood) and John Payne, who were watching the parade from a window."

Although the film is set during the Christmas season, studio head Darryl F. Zanuck insisted that it be released in May, arguing that more people go to the movies in warmer weather. The studio rushed to promote it while keeping its Christmas setting a secret. Fox's promotional trailer depicted a fictional producer roaming the studio backlot and encountering such stars as Rex Harrison, Anne Baxter, Peggy Ann Garner, and Dick Haymes extolling the virtues of the film. In addition, the movie posters prominently featured O'Hara and Payne, with Gwenn's character kept in the background. The film opened in New York City at the Roxy Theatre on June 4, 1947. By contrast, modern home video packaging has Gwenn and Wood dominating the imagery, with the DVD release having Kringle in his Santa Claus costume.

O'Hara was initially reluctant to take the role, having recently moved back to post-war Ireland. She immediately changed her mind after reading the script and came back to the United States for the film.

Arthur Jacobson, assistant director, filmed the Macy's Parade on Thanksgiving morning with nine cameras simultaneously. He said he "plunked actors Edmund Gwenn and Natalie Wood in the department store cafeteria line during a weekday lunch-rush". When Maureen O'Hara requested a special police escort for a Christmas shopping spree through Macy's he said "I know New Yorkers. They aren't going to pay any attention to you. And don't wear a bandanna around your head or dark glasses. Just be normal."

Throughout the process of getting this script accepted by the PCA, the movie underwent multiple different title changes, starting as My Heart Tells Me and then progressing into The Big Heart, It's Only Human, Meet Me at Dawn, and finally ended with the name Miracle on 34th Street. These title changes all happened within a four-month time period. These title changes occurred while the filmmakers were fixing any other discrepancies that the PCA required them to fix before the production of the film could begin.

Reception

Critical reception
Miracle on 34th Street mostly received positive reviews from critics. Bosley Crowther of The New York Times said: "For all those blasé skeptics who do not believe in Santa Claus—and likewise for all those natives who have grown cynical about New York—but most especially for all those patrons who have grown weary of the monotonies of the screen, let us heartily recommend the Roxy's new picture, Miracle on 34th Street. As a matter of fact, let's go further: let's catch its spirit and heartily proclaim that it is the freshest little picture in a long time, and maybe even the best comedy of this year." A critic for the BBC called it "a clever and deeply original story, that remains true and confident in direction, while delivering considerable charm all the while."

The film is considered by many to be one of the best films of 1947, and it has been dubbed a "christmas classic" by several publications. The website's critics consensus reads, "Irrefutable proof that gentle sentimentalism can be the chief ingredient in a wonderful film, Miracle on 34th Street delivers a warm holiday message without resorting to treacle."

The Catholic Legion of Decency gave the movie a "B", "morally objectionable in part" rating. This was mainly due to the fact that O'Hara portrayed a divorcée in the film.

Accolades
The film won Academy Awards for Best Actor in a Supporting Role (Edmund Gwenn), Best Writing, Original Story (Valentine Davies) and Best Writing, Screenplay. It was also nominated for Best Picture, losing to Gentleman's Agreement.

It was ranked ninth by the American Film Institute on 100 Years... 100 Cheers, a list of America's most inspiring films. Miracle on 34th Street was listed as the fifth best film in the fantasy genre in the American Film Institute's "Ten top Ten" lists in 2008.

In 2005, Miracle on 34th Street was selected for preservation in the United States National Film Registry by the Library of Congress as being "culturally, historically, or aesthetically significant".

American Film Institute Lists
 AFI's 100 Years...100 Movies – Nominated
 AFI's 100 Years of Film Scores – Nominated
 AFI's 100 Years...100 Cheers – #9
 AFI's 100 Years...100 Movies (10th Anniversary Edition) – Nominated
 AFI's 10 Top 10 – #5 Fantasy Film

Home media and colorization

Miracle on 34th Street was first released on VHS and LaserDisc in 1987.

In 1985, it became one of the first full-length black and white films to be colorized. The 4½-month process was carried out by Color Systems Technology, Inc. In 1993, this version was released on VHS and LaserDisc, and was followed four years later by a "50th Anniversary Edition" on both formats, remastered by THX.

The first DVD release was in October 1999, featuring the B&W version alongside the original theatrical trailer and a TV spot. In November 2006, it was re-released as a two-disc "Special Edition" DVD, with disc one containing an "all new colorized version" carried out by Legend Films. The second disc had the original black-and-white version and numerous extras, including The 20th Century Fox Hours 1955 TV remake. Both discs also included a full-length audio commentary by Maureen O'Hara. The B&W disc has since been re-released several times, including in a pairing with the 1994 remake.

In October 2009, 20th Century Fox released the B&W version on Blu-ray with all previous extras, bar the TV remake.

In 2017, the film was restored in 4K resolution; so far this version is only available via DCP.

Remake

A 1994 feature film starred Richard Attenborough, Elizabeth Perkins, Dylan McDermott, J. T. Walsh, Timothy Shea, James Remar, Jane Leeves, Simon Jones, William Windom and Mara Wilson. It was adapted by John Hughes from the Seaton script, and directed by Les Mayfield. Due to Macy's refusal to give permission to use its name, it was replaced by the fictitious "Cole's". "We feel the original stands on its own and could not be improved upon," said Laura Melillo, a spokeswoman for Macy's. Gimbels no longer existed by 1994 so its name was replaced by the name of the fictional "Shopper's Express". Alvin Greenman (Alfred in the original version) played a doorman. The 1994 remake of the film had a more serious tone than the original 1947 film had and a large portion of the plot was rewritten, although the majority of both the plot and the characters remained intact. The 1994 film also added a subtext which described concerns about religious faith.

In other media
There are numerous remakes of the movie, as well as a Broadway musical.

Radio
Lux Radio Theatre aired a one-hour adaptation of the movie on three occasions: on December 22, 1947, which starred the original cast including Natalie Wood; on December 20, 1948, without Natalie Wood's participation; and on December 21, 1954. There were also two broadcasts on Screen Directors Playhouse: as a half-hour play on December 23, 1949; and then as a one-hour play on December 21, 1950. All of these adaptations had Edmund Gwenn reprising his screen role.

Theatre
A 1963 Broadway musical version, entitled Here's Love, was written by Meredith Willson.

The novella was adapted into a stage play by Will Severin, Patricia Di Benedetto Snyder and John Vreeke in 2000. It is a favorite in many community and regional theaters during the Christmas season. The characters' names are those used in the novella, and the stage setting is distinctly late 1940s. Production rights are held by Samuel French, Inc.

Television
A 1955 one-hour television adaptation of the movie starred Thomas Mitchell as Kris, Macdonald Carey as Fred, Teresa Wright as Doris, and Sandy Descher as Susan. This version did not show the drunken Santa at all. Titled The Miracle on 34th Street, it originally aired as an episode of The 20th Century Fox Hour. It was later re-run as "Meet Mr. Kringle".

Ed Wynn played Kris in a 1959 television adaptation of the movie. Also featured was Orson Bean. It was broadcast live and in color on NBC the day after Thanksgiving. NBC made a kinescope of the program, probably for broadcasting opening night on the West Coast. The copy was in a large collection of kinescopes donated by NBC to the Library of Congress and later unearthed by Richard Finegan, who reported his experiences in the December 2005 issue of Classic Images.

A 1973 television version featured Jane Alexander, David Hartman, Roddy McDowall, Sebastian Cabot as Kris (without his natural beard; he was forced to shave and wear a false beard for the role), Suzanne Davidson, Jim Backus, David Doyle and Tom Bosley. It was adapted by Jeb Rosebrook from the George Seaton screenplay, and directed by Fielder Cook. Mrs. Walker's first name is changed to Karen in this version. This would prove to be the final version in which the department store was actually Macy's. David Doyle, who played R. H. Macy in this version, had played Mr. Sawyer in the original Broadway cast of Here's Love 10 years earlier.

Puppets
In 2012, the flagship Macy's Department Store at Herald Square in New York City featured a 30-minute puppet version of the story within its Santaland display, featuring the voice talents of Broadway stars Brian Stokes Mitchell and Victoria Clark.

Appearances
A short clip of the film was seen on the kitchen television screen in Home Alone (a 1990 Christmas film released by Fox) and also the ending was seen in the den television screen in the 1996 film The Preacher's Wife.

See also
 Trial film
 List of Christmas films
 Santa Claus in film

References

External links

 
 
 
 
 Backstage and deleted scenes

Streaming audio
 Miracle on 34th Street on Lux Radio Theater: December 22, 1947
 Miracle on 34th Street on Screen Directors Playhouse: December 23, 1949
 Miracle on 34th Street on Screen Directors Playhouse: December 21, 1950
 Miracle on 34th Street on Lux Radio Theater: December 21, 1954

 
1947 films
1947 comedy-drama films
1940s American films
1940s Christmas comedy-drama films
1940s English-language films
1940s fantasy comedy-drama films
20th Century Fox films
American black-and-white films
American Christmas comedy-drama films
American courtroom films
American fantasy comedy-drama films
Films about lawyers
Films about mother–daughter relationships
Films based on short fiction
Films directed by George Seaton
Films featuring a Best Supporting Actor Academy Award-winning performance
Films produced by William Perlberg
Films scored by Cyril J. Mockridge
Films set in department stores
Films set in Manhattan
Films shot in New York City
Films that won the Academy Award for Best Story
Films whose writer won the Best Adapted Screenplay Academy Award
Legal comedy films
Macy's
Santa Claus in film
United States National Film Registry films